"Be Strong" is a pop ballad written by Bridget Benenate, Matthew Gerrard, and Delta Goodrem, produced by Gerrard for Goodrem's second album Mistaken Identity (2004). It was released as the album's fifth and final single in Australia as a digital download on 17 October 2005. At the time of release, digital downloads were not included as part of the main singles chart, therefore "Be Strong" was ineligible to chart. In the DVD for her album Mistaken Identity, Goodrem reveals she wrote the song in support of her good friend and fellow cancer sufferer, late actress Belinda Emmett.

"Be Strong" was released with two exclusive and previously unreleased live B-sides: "Be Strong" and "Last Night on Earth", both recorded at the Sydney Super Dome on Goodrem's 2005 Visualise Tour. The video for "Be Strong" was also a hit on both the TV and the internet, taking out the number-one spot on the Yahoo! Music Video chart. It featured footage from Goodrem's before-mentioned, Visualise Tour in 2005.

The single was also released as a strictly limited edition promotional CD single. Sony BMG confirmed that 100 of these CD singles were pressed, 10 of which were the major prize in a competition on Goodrem's official website.

Track listing
Limited edition CD single
 "Be Strong"

Digital download
 "Be Strong"
 "Be Strong" (Visualise Tour Live 2005)
 "Last Night on Earth" (Visualise Tour Live 2005)

External links
Song Lyrics

2004 songs
2005 singles
Delta Goodrem songs
Songs written by Matthew Gerrard
Songs written by Bridget Benenate
Songs written by Delta Goodrem
Pop ballads
Song recordings produced by Matthew Gerrard
Epic Records singles